Frank Glazer (February 19, 1915 – January 13, 2015) was an American pianist, composer, and teacher of music.

Career details

Glazer was born in Chester, Wisconsin on February 19, 1915, the sixth child of Benjamin and Clara Glazer, Jewish emigrants from Lithuania. The family moved to Milwaukee in 1919.   His first piano lessons were given by his sister Blanche (1907–1920); later he was taught by several local musicians. Frank Glazer was educated in Milwaukee Public Schools, and graduated the city's North Division High School in 1932. In his teenage years, he played in  his brothers' dance band, his high school band and vaudeville. Alfred Strelsin, a New York City signage manufacturer and arts patron, provided the funds for Glazer to travel to Berlin in 1932 to study with Artur Schnabel; he also studied with Arnold Schoenberg. Glazer then taught piano in Cambridge, Massachusetts.

Strelsin urged Glazer to make his New York debut, telling him, "If you don't start by the time you're 21, forget it". Glazer made his debut at Town Hall in New York City on October 20, 1936, with a program of Bach, Brahms, Schubert and Chopin. He played this program again in 2006, to celebrate his seventieth anniversary of public performance. In 1939 Glazer performed with the Boston Symphony Orchestra under Sergei Koussevitzky. Glazer served in the United States Army as an interpreter from 1943 to 1945 in Germany and France.

In the early 1950s, Glazer had his own television show called Playhouse 15 in Milwaukee. On September 6, 1952, he married classical singer Ruth Gevalt (1910–2006). (1) With his wife, Ruth, he founded in the 1970s the Saco River Festival in Maine, a summer chamber series. From 1965 until 1980 Glazer taught at the Eastman School of Music; among his students Myriam Avalos and Martin Amlin. In 1980 Glazer left Eastman and became artist in residence at Bates College in Maine.

Glazer has been called "the greatest interpreter of the piano music of Erik Satie". In the 1960s he recorded the complete piano music of Satie for the Vox label.

Glazer died at the age of 99 on January 13, 2015. His brother David was a clarinetist who performed with the New York Woodwind Quintet for more than 35 years.

References

Notes
(1) The Fountain of Youth: The Artistry of Frank Glazer, by Duncan J Cumming  (VDM Verlag, Saarbrücken, Germany, 2009).

External links
Frank Glazer's official website (www.FrankGlazer.in)
Time in His Hands: Frank Glazer's musical light shines undimmed 70 years after his New York debut", Doug Hubley, Bates Magazine Online, Fall 2006 edition.
At 95, pianist is still learning, Milwaukee Journal-Sentinel, published October 9, 2010.
Frank Glazer's Long Road, American Public Media, published March 2, 2012.
Maine Pianist Frank Glazer Dies at 99 Portland Press Herald, published January 13, 2015, updated January 14, 2015

1915 births
2015 deaths
American classical pianists
American male classical pianists
American people of Lithuanian-Jewish descent
Bates College faculty
Jewish American musicians
People from Dodge County, Wisconsin
Musicians from Milwaukee
Pupils of Maria Curcio
Vaudeville performers
People from Topsham, Maine
20th-century classical pianists
20th-century American pianists
Classical musicians from Wisconsin
20th-century American male musicians
North Division High School (Milwaukee) alumni
21st-century American Jews